The 1880 Caernarvonshire by-election was a parliamentary by-election held for the House of Commons constituency of Caernarvonshire in Wales on 2 December 1880.

Vacancy
The by-election was caused by the resignation of the sitting Liberal MP, Watkin Williams, who was appointed as a judge of the Queen's Bench Division of the High Court of Justice.

Candidates
Two candidates were nominated by the two main parties of the time.

The Liberal Party nominated businessman William Rathbone.

The Conservative Party nominated Welsh landowner and magistrate Hugh Ellis-Nanney.

Results

References

History of Caernarfonshire
1880 elections in the United Kingdom
By-elections to the Parliament of the United Kingdom in Welsh constituencies
1880 in Wales
1880s elections in Wales
December 1880 events
Politics of Caernarfonshire